Malmö Municipality is one of the 29 multi-member constituencies of the Riksdag, the national legislature of Sweden. The constituency was established in 1994 from parts of Fyrstadskretsen following the reorganisation of the constituencies in Malmöhus County. It is conterminous with the municipality of Malmö. The constituency currently elects 10 of the 349 members of the Riksdag using the open party-list proportional representation electoral system. At the 2022 general election it had 251,172 registered electors.

Electoral system
Malmö Municipality currently elects 10 of the 349 members of the Riksdag using the open party-list proportional representation electoral system. Constituency seats are allocated using the modified Sainte-Laguë method. Only parties that that reach the 4% national threshold and parties that receive at least 12% of the vote in the constituency compete for constituency seats. Supplementary leveling seats may also be allocated at the constituency level to parties that reach the 4% national threshold.

Election results

Summary

(Excludes leveling seats)

Detailed

2020s

2022
Results of the 2022 general election held on 11 September 2022:

The following candidates were elected:
 Constituency seats - Rose-Marie Carlsson (S), 639 votes; Jamal El-Haj (S), 1,417 votes; Nima Gholam Ali Pour (SD), 44 votes; Momodou Malcolm Jallow (V), 1,840 votes; Rasmus Ling (MP), 383 votes; Noria Manouchi (M), 1,819 votes; Peter Ollén (M), 360 votes; Niels Paarup-Petersen (C), 318 votes; Patrick Reslow (SD), 90 votes; and Joakim Sandell (S), 3,047 votes.
 Leveling seats - Louise Eklund (L), 398 votes.

2010s

2018
Results of the 2018 general election held on 9 September 2018:

The following candidates were elected:
 Constituency seats - Tobias Billström (M), 2,774 votes; Jamal El-Haj (S), 3,360 votes; Malcolm Jallow (V), 1,560 votes; Hillevi Larsson (S), 1,607 votes; Noria Manouchi (M), 505 votes; Niels Paarup-Petersen (C), 222 votes; Per Ramhorn (SD), 95 votes; Joakim Sandell (S), 2,198 votes; Sara Seppälä (SD), 3 votes; and Allan Widman (L), 448 votes.
 Leveling seats - Rasmus Ling (MP), 298 votes.

2014
Results of the 2014 general election held on 14 September 2014:

The following candidates were elected:
 Constituency seats - Jennie Åfeldt (SD), 1 vote; Tobias Billström (M), 2,026 votes; Anders Forsberg (SD), 5 votes; Marie Granlund (S), 2,520 votes; Leif Jakobsson (S), 955 votes; Hillevi Larsson (S), 1,247 votes; Olof Lavesson (M), 409 votes; Rasmus Ling (MP), 569 votes; Patrick Reslow (M), 711 votes; and Daniel Sestrajcic (V), 1,058 votes.
 Leveling seats - Allan Widman (FP), 635 votes.

2010
Results of the 2010 general election held on 19 September 2010:

The following candidates were elected:
 Constituency seats - Tobias Billström (M), 3,801 votes; Maria Ferm (MP), 1,199 votes; Josef Fransson (SD), 1 vote; Marie Granlund (S), 3,100 votes; Leif Jakobsson (S), 858 votes; Hillevi Larsson (S), 1,239 votes; Olof Lavesson (M), 554 votes; Patrick Reslow (M), 728 votes; and Allan Widman (FP), 702 votes.
 Leveling seats - Marianne Berg (V), 451 votes.

2000s

2006
Results of the 2006 general election held on 17 September 2006:

The following candidates were elected:
 Constituency seats - Luciano Astudillo (S), 1,743 votes; Tobias Billström (M), 2,482 votes; Inge Garstedt (M), 899 votes; Marie Granlund (S), 3,061 votes; Leif Jakobsson (S), 1,156 votes; Hillevi Larsson (S), 799 votes; Olof Lavesson (M), 307 votes; Karin Svensson Smith (MP), 472 votes; and Allan Widman (FP), 742 votes.
 Leveling seats - Marianne Berg (V), 369 votes.

2002
Results of the 2002 general election held on 15 September 2002:

The following candidates were elected:
 Constituency seats - Tobias Billström (M), 1,669 votes; Marie Granlund (S), 176 votes; Leif Jakobsson (S), 65 votes; Britt-Marie Lindkvist (S), 131 votes; Lars-Erik Lövdén (S), 143 votes; Sten Lundström (V), 655 votes; Göran Persson (S), 17,444 votes; Carl-Axel Roslund (M), 1,199 votes; and Allan Widman (FP), 1,112 votes.

1990s

1998
Results of the 1998 general election held on 20 September 1998:

The following candidates were elected:
 Constituency seats - Sten Andersson (M), 2,479 votes; Margit Gennser (M), 1,258 votes; Marie Granlund (S), 458 votes; Britt-Marie Lindkvist (S), 239 votes; Lars-Erik Lövdén (S), 323 votes; Sten Lundström (V), 693 votes; Bertil Persson (M), 519 votes; Göran Persson (S), 15,117 votes; and Maj-Britt Wallhorn (KD), 2 votes.

1994
Results of the 1994 general election held on 18 September 1994:

References

Riksdag constituency
Riksdag constituencies
Riksdag constituencies established in 1994